Lake Helen is a lake in the U.S. state of Wisconsin.

According to tradition, the lake is named after a lady named Helen who cooked for local lumberjacks in the 1880s.

References

Lakes of Wisconsin
Bodies of water of Portage County, Wisconsin